Musafir is a 1986 Indian Hindi drama film written and directed by Jabbar Patel. Based on Vijay Tendulkar's Marathi play Ashi Pakhare Yeti, the film is part of India's neorealist art films, known in India as parallel cinema.

Cast
The cast is as follows:
Rekha as Saraswasti Pillai
Naseeruddin Shah as Sadanand
Moon Moon Sen as Shyama
Mohan Agashe as P A Pillai
Benjamin Gilani as Anand
Pankaj Kapur as Shankeran Pillai
Usha Nadkarni as Parvati Pillai

Production
Filming of the film completed in 1986.

Soundtrack

Release and reception
The film did not have a theatrical release, but was released on VHS. The National Film Development Corporation of India decided to restore it in 2010.

References

Sources

External links

1951 films
1950s Hindi-language films